Bertram Jay Turetzky (born February 14, 1933) is a contemporary American double bass (contrabass) soloist, composer, teacher, and author of The Contemporary Contrabass (1974, 1989), a book that looked at a number of new and interesting ways of playing the double bass including featuring it as a solo performance vehicle with no other instrumental accompaniment.

Career
Turetzky has performed and recorded more than 300 pieces written by and for him. He is a composer whose music has achieved some prominence, as have his interpretations of early music and composers like Domenico Dragonetti. Music critic Michael Steinberg has praised his continuo playing. Turetzky has appeared as a featured soloist in the major music centers of the world and is the most widely recorded solo doublebass player with seven albums on Advance, Ars Nova, Nonesuch, Takoma, Desto and Finnadar music labels.

Turetzky is a versatile musician, conversant in chamber music, baroque music, classical, jazz, renaissance music, improvisational music and many different genres of world music. He has also developed a special affinity for klezmer music.

In addition to The Contemporary Contrabass, Turetzky has co-edited a book series called The New Instrumentation; seven of a planned eight volumes have been finished. Turetzky wrote an introduction to The Autobiography of Pops Foster: New Orleans Jazz Man which spoke to the early development of jazz bass playing.

Bernard Jacobson of the Chicago Daily News described Turestzky as "a virtuoso of caliber unsurpassed by any other practitioner of his instrument today."

Biography 
Turetzky was born in Norwich, Connecticut, United States, and grew up there. He received a master's degree in music history from the University of Hartford. In his youth, he was drawn to classic jazz music, playing professionally in that style at his first performances. His aspiration to be a jazz player was encouraged by many of the older swing stars. Turetzky continues to play classic jazz, and appears regularly at jazz festivals.

Turetzky first recorded in 1964, featuring the work of American composers George Perle, Edgard Varèse, Donald Martino, Kenneth Gaburo, Ben Johnston, and an early instrument and tape piece by Charles Whittenburg. Recording activities continued with records on labels Nonesuch, Son Nova, Ars Antigua, and Desto. He has worked with Charles Mingus, and has made a series of recent recordings on the Nine Winds label with improvisational musicians George E. Lewis, Vinny Golia, Wadada Leo Smith, Mike Wofford and others.

Turetzky is a Distinguished Emeritus Professor of Music at the University of California, San Diego.
His former students include bass virtuosos Mark Dresser and Karl E. H. Seigfried; Dresser now holds Turetzky's former UCSD faculty position, while Seigfried is working with Turetzky on the latter's autobiography.

He is married to flutist Nancy Turetzky, and they have two sons and a daughter, and live in Del Mar, California.

He also plays the guitar, piano, and banjo.

Selected discography 
 Recording (solo LP), Bertram Turetzky, "Contrabassist," in a Recital of New Music, Advance FGR-1, 1964.
 Recording (solo LP), Bertram Turetzky, The Virtuoso Double Bass, Medea Records, 1966.
 Recording, Music by Donald Erb, In No Strange Land, Nonesuch Records, 1968.
 Recording (solo LP), Bertram Turetzky, The New World of Sound, Ars Nova, 1969.
 Recording (solo LP), Bertram Turetzky, The Contemporary Contrabass, Music of John Cage, Ben Johnson, and Pauline Oliveros, Nonesuch Records, 1969–70.
 Recording, Music for Young Listeners, by Netty Simons, CRI Records, 1973.
 Recording, Gorge, by Phil Winsor, at Mills College, Oakland, funded by a Ford Foundation Grant, 1973.
 Recording, Dragonetti Lives, Takoma Records, 1975.
 Recording, Strings, Standard School Broadcast: Music Makers, Chevron Research Company, 1975.
 Recording, Spectra, by Feiciano, CRI, 1975.
 Recording, Witold Szalonek Symphonia Concertante, solo contrabass and orchestra, Polska Musykna, 1975.
 Recording, Found Objects II, by Arthur Custer, Serenus, 1976.
 Recording (solo LP), Music by Donald Erb, J.M Mestres-Quadreny, Will Ogden, Netty Simons, Desto DC7128, 1976.
 Recording, Tree Music (principal soloist), Logs and Logs XVI, by Paul Chihara, CRI SD 269, 1976.
 Recording (solo LP), The Contemporary Contrabass, Nonesuch, 1976.
 Recording (solo LP), New Music for Contrabass, compositions by Charles Mingus, Boguslaw Schaffer, Joseph Julian, Bertram Turetzky and Donald Erb, Finnadar SR 9105, 1976.
 Recording, Piece for Four, by Olly Wilson, CRI SD 264, 1976.
 Recording, Trio for Two, by Donald Erb, and Points-Lines-Circles, by Dorrance Stalvey, ARS NOVA AN-1008, 1976.
 Recording, Modules, by Richard Moryl, Serenus, 1976.
 Recording, Inflections I, by Robert Hall Lewis (for solo contrabass), on New Music for Virtuoso/2, New World Records, Recorded Anthology of American Music, Inc., NW 254 Stereo, recorded December 4, 1977, released November 1978.
 Recording for ABC, Works by Hoffman, Turetzky, Mingus, and McCartney-Lennon, Sydney, AUSTRALIA, August 5, 1978.
 Recording for ABC, with Nancy Turetzky, recorded live, NSW Conservatorium, Sydney, AUSTRALIA, August 7, 1978.
 Recording for ABC, Concerto for Bass and Jazz Band, by Donald Hannah, Brian May, Conductor, Melbourne, AUSTRALIA, August 8, 1978.
 Recording, Playback, by Barry Cunyngham, The University of Melbourne, for Move Records, Melbourne, AUSTRALIA, August 9, 1978.
 Recording, Trio for Violin, Contrabass & Piano, by Leonid Hrabovsky, on 20th Century Ukrainian Violin Music  1987 cassette recording CYFP 2032 by Yevshan Corporation, Canada, Library of Congress Card no. 78-7509959 (first recorded in 1964, 1975 on ORION-ORS 79331), First western recording of music by Ukrainian composer Leonid Hrabovsky, recorded September 1978, released June 1979.
 Recording, Celestial Variations on Charles Ives' Serenity (1919), performed by Turetzky on 16-track tape, summer 1979. (Funded by a National Endowment for the Arts Grant), 1979.
 Recording, A Different View, Turetzky (solo contrabass). Turetzky, contrabass, LP, Folkways Records, New York City, 1982.
 Recording, Turetzky Featured Soloist in Phil Winsor's Gorge, written for Turetzky, Brewster Records, 1982.
 Recording, Turetzky settings and performance of selections from Sherley Anne Williams, Some Sweet Angel Chile, Blues Economique Records, September 25, 1984.
 Recording, Turetzky settings and performance of Jerome Rothenberg's, Poland 1931 and Dada Suite, Blues Economique Records, September 25, 1984.
 CD, Intersections, Bertram Turetzky and Vinny Golia, 9 Winds Label, NWCD0129 DDD, 1990.
 CD recording of San Diego Symphony Ensemble performing Roger Reynolds' Whispers Out of Time and Transfigured Wind, New World Records, 1990.
 CD, Ricercar a' 3, by Robert Erickson for solo contrabass, for CRI Records, November 1991.
 CD recording of Stuart Saunders Smith's' Notebook on CD titled Crux, O.O. Discs, USA, 1992.
 Recording, Second Avenue Klezmer Ensemble, Traditions and Transitions Second Avenue Productions, San Diego, 1992.
 CD recording of Stuart Saunders Smith's' Notebook on CD titled Crux, O.O. Discs, USA, 1992.
 CD recording of SONOR Ensemble of the University of California, San Diego, CRI CD 652, 1993.
 CD recording Compositions and Improvisations by Bertram Turetzky, Studio 101, 9 Winds Records, 1993.
 CD recording of Turetzky's Pacific Parable, winner of San Diego Music Award, Studio 101, Orphan Records, June 24, 1993.
 CD recording, Ais by Iannis Xenakis, Neuma Records, 1994.
 CD recording, Prataksis by Wadada Leo Smith, Nine Winds, 1997.
 CD recording, Inflections I by Robert Hall Lewis, New World Records 80541-2, 1998.
 CD recording, Logs by Paul Chihara, CRI CD 815, 1999.
 CD recording, Three Pieces for Double Bass Alone, by Donald Erb, on CD titled Suddenly It's Evening, CRI CD 857, 1999.

Bibliography 
 Book, The Contemporary Contrabass, by Bertram Turetzky. The New Instrumentation, Vol. I, co-edited by Turetzky and Barney Childs, Berkeley: The University of California Press, 1974.
 Book, The Avant Garde Flute by Thomas Howell. The New Instrumentation, Vol. II, co-edited by Turetzky and Barney Childs, Berkeley: The University of California Press, 1975.
 Book, The Modern Trombone by Stuart Dempster, The New Instrumentation, Vol. III, co-edited by Turetzky and Barney Childs, Berkeley: The University of California Press, 1975.
 Book, New Directions for Clarinet by Philip Rehfeldt. The New Instrumentation, Vol. IV, co-edited by Turetzky and Barney Childs, Berkeley: The University of California Press, 1976.
 Book, The Contemporary Guitar, by John Schneider. The New Instrumentation, Vol. V, co-edited by Turetzky and Barney Childs, Berkeley: The University of California Press, 1982.
 Book, Writing for Pedal Harp, by Lou Anne Neil. The New Instrumentation, Vol. VI, co-edited by Turetzky and Barney Childs, Berkeley: The University of California Press, 1985.
 Book, The Contemporary Contrabass, by Bertram Turetzky. The New Instrumentation, Vol. VII, co-edited by Turetzky and Barney Childs, Berkeley: The University of California Press, Second Edition, Revised, 1989.

Notes and references 

 Applebaum, Samuel. The Way they Play, Paganiniana Publications, 1984.
 Anderson, E. Ruth. Contemporary American composers. A biographical dictionary, Second edition, G. K. Hall, 1982.
 Larkin, Colin. The Guinness Encyclopedia of Popular Music, Guinness Publishing, 1992.
 Press, Jaques Cattell (Ed.). Who's who in American Music. Classical, First edition. R. R. Bowker, New York 1983.
 
 Sadie, Stanley; Hitchcock, H. Wiley (Ed.). The New Grove Dictionary of American Music. Grove's Dictionaries of Music, 1986.

External links 
  from UCSD site

Interviews 
 Bertram Turetzky interview by Bruce Duffie
 Bertram Turetzky: A Different View Interview
Bert Turetzky Interview NAMM Oral History Library (2005)

Classical double-bassists
1933 births
Living people
University of Hartford alumni
Jewish classical musicians
Jewish American classical composers
University of California, San Diego faculty
People from Norwich, Connecticut
Contemporary classical music performers
20th-century classical composers
American male classical composers
American classical composers
American classical double-bassists
Male double-bassists
Place of birth missing (living people)
20th-century American composers
21st-century double-bassists
20th-century American male musicians
21st-century American male musicians
Incus Records artists
21st-century American Jews